Anshei Sphard Beth El Emeth Congregation is a Modern Orthodox synagogue located in suburban East Memphis, Tennessee.

History 
Anshei Sphard Beth El Emeth Congregation (ASBEE) was formed by the 1966 merger of Anshei Sphard and Beth El Emeth, two Memphis Orthodox congregations with 19th century roots.

Beth El Emeth was formed in 1861 by a group of dissatisfied members from the B'nai Israel Congregation (now Temple Israel). These members objected to B'nai Israel's move toward Reform Judaism.  Their new congregation, guided by Rabbi Jacob Peres, who had been B'nai Israel's first rabbi, was committed to maintaining the "minhag Polen" (traditions of the Polish Jews).  In its initial years, the shul's leadership would prove to be less than stable. Its first religious leader was Chazan Elya Marcuson, whose stint would be quite brief. In 1863, Beth El Emeth got its first rabbi in Joel Alexander of Brooklyn, New York, who would only preside for three short years until his death in 1866. In the coming years, the rabbinate would be in flux. 
By 1872, the shul had acquired a cemetery, which was located south of Central Avenue and north of Cane Creek, according to the Shelby County directory. In the mid-1870s, Ferdinand Leopold Sarner, a former chaplain in the Civil War, became the new rabbi. 
The Yellow Fever epidemic in Memphis in the late 1870s would deliver a huge blow to the congregation, killing off Peres, Sarner, and much of its membership. In 1880, services were suspended, only to be continued the next year, according to the Shelby County directory. In 1882, the remaining members of the congregation engaged in talks with Bnai Israel in the hope of a merger. Bnai Israel decided that whereas they would not merge as a whole, they would accept members on an individual basis. Beginning in 1884, the congregation would no longer be listed in Shelby County directories. The cemetery would similarly vanish from directories in 1887.
In 1891, Beth El Emeth reappears in the directories on Poplar and Washington in Cochrane Hall. At the same time, there is another shul called Tiferes Israel in the Knights of Pythias Hall. It says in the directories that the reader for the Beth El Emeth was Moses Franklin. In 1893, the directories do not include Beth El Emeth, but it says that Tiferes Israel is located in Cochrane Hall and the reader is Moses Franklin. One can assume that the two congregations merged. The Tiferes Israel cemetery, acquired in 1891, was located on Pigeon Roost Road. The congregation disappears from directories in 1897, in the same year as the Baron Hirsch Congregation begins to appear. In 1898, the Baron Hirsch cemetery is located on Pigeon Roost Road. One can therefore assume that Tiferes Israel (Beth El Emeth) merged with Baron Hirsch, but it is not completely clear. 
In 1916, B’nai Israel left its building on Poplar and a group of Orthodox Jews took over the facility, and called themselves Beth El Emeth. For whatever reason, Beth El Emeth does not appear in the directories until 1929. They remained there until 1957. Many things remain unclear: Where did these people who started this new Beth El Emeth come from? Were they a continuation of the 1890s Beth El Emeth? Was the 1890s Beth El Emeth a continuation of the original Beth El Emeth? Pending further evidence, it is unknown.
Anshei Sphard was organized in 1893, chartered in 1904, and located in the Pinch district of Memphis until 1948.  It was originally formed by a group of Polish Jews wishing to observe Sephardic traditions.  Anshei Sphard purchased land for a cemetery in 1907.

By the 1960s, both congregations found themselves with declining membership as their constituencies progressively moved to the east. By 1966 they had agreed to merge, and in 1970 they opened their new facility in East Memphis.

The congregation is known for its annual Kosher barbecue competition, reportedly the first such Kosher competition in the world.  The competition was established in 1988, after members of the congregation first sought to establish an event for Kosher-observant, non-pork-eating Jews as part of the city's large Memphis in May "World Championship Barbecue" contest.  By 2011, the contest was attracting thousands of participants, including Halal-observant Muslims as well as Jews.

In late 2020, the congregation, upon selling their building, moved services to the Baron Hirsch Congregation, where they are currently renting space for an independent Shabbat morning service.

References

External links 

 
ASBEE World Kosher BBQ Championship

Ashkenazi Jewish culture in the United States
Ashkenazi synagogues
Buildings and structures in Memphis, Tennessee
Jews and Judaism in Memphis, Tennessee
Modern Orthodox synagogues in the United States
Orthodox synagogues in Tennessee
Polish-Jewish culture in the United States
Synagogues completed in 1970